Parke Shepherd Rouse Jr. (1915 – March 5, 1997) was an American journalist, writer and historian in Tidewater Virginia.

Biography

Early life
Parke S. Rouse Jr. was a native of the Town of Smithfield. He spent most of his childhood in Newport News, Virginia and was a 1937 graduate of Washington and Lee University in Lexington, Virginia. He served in the U.S. Navy during World War II on the staff of Admiral Chester W. Nimitz.

Journalist
During his early years as a journalist, prior to World War II, Rouse worked for the Newport News Times-Herald and for the Richmond Times-Dispatch. After the War, Rouse returned to Virginia, where he served as an assistant to the Richmond Times-Dispatch's editor, Virginius Dabney, and later as the paper's Sunday Editor. In later life Rouse wrote a weekly column about Tidewater Virginia for the Newport News Daily Press.

Author
Rouse combined his love of early Virginia history with his exceptional writing skills to produce 22 books and hundreds of newspaper columns on Virginia history, all marked by their author's innate grace, humor, and storytelling talent. Among Rouse's best-known works were a biography of James Blair, founder and first president of the College of William and Mary; a history of the college president's house; and a popular chronicle of Williamsburg's history before and during its restoration as Colonial Williamsburg by John D. Rockefeller Jr., Abby Aldrich Rockefeller, and the Reverend Dr. W.A.R. Goodwin.

Colonial Williamsburg
In 1953, Parke Rouse became director of publications for the Colonial Williamsburg Foundation and worked closely with eventual president and chairman of the Foundation, Carlisle H. Humelsine.

Commonwealth of Virginia
Throughout his adult life, Rouse served in several public positions. In 1950 he joined the Virginia Chamber of Commerce. In 1954, he became the first executive director of Jamestown Festival Park and later the Jamestown-Yorktown Foundation, a post he held for 26 years until his retirement. He served as the director of Virginia's official celebration of Jamestown's 350th anniversary in 1957. From 1974 through 1980, Rouse also served as the Executive Director of the Virginia Independence Bicentennial Commission and assisted in the planning for the 1976 visit of Queen Elizabeth II to Jamestown and Williamsburg. Virginia Governor Gerald Baliles proclaimed Rouse a Virginia Laureate in 1988 in recognition for his "contributions preserving the Commonwealth's heritage."

In 1998, the Virginia General Assembly passed a posthumous Resolution commending his contributions to the Commonwealth.

Partial bibliography

See also
 List of newspaper columnists

References

Further reading
 Virginia Legislative Information System 1998 Resolution adopted upon the passing of Parke Rouse Jr.
 Obituary, The Virginian-Pilot, March 6, 1997, p. B9

American male journalists
1997 deaths
People from Williamsburg, Virginia
1915 births
People from Smithfield, Virginia
Historians of Virginia
20th-century American historians
American male non-fiction writers
Journalists from Virginia
20th-century American journalists
Historians from Virginia
20th-century American male writers